Tharwat Bassily Ph.D., (14 September 1940 – 5 December 2017) was an Egyptian businessman. Bassily graduated from the Faculty of Pharmacy, Cairo University in 1967. He was founder and chairman of the board of Amoun Pharmaceutical Company S.A.E., one of the leading private pharmaceutical companies in Egypt. Bassily was also the undersecretary of the Holy Synod of the Coptic Orthodox Church, a member of the Shura Council, and the founder of Coptic TV.

References

External links 
 Amoun Pharmaceutical Company
 ctv channel

1940 births
2017 deaths
Coptic businesspeople
20th-century Egyptian businesspeople
Egyptian people of Coptic descent
Coptic Orthodox Christians from Egypt
Egyptian billionaires
Egyptian company founders